The Ware Formation is a fossiliferous geological formation of the Cocinetas Basin in the northernmost department of La Guajira. The formation consists of fine lithic to quartzitic sandstones, mudstones, pebbly conglomerates with sedimentary and metamorphic rock fragments, fossiliferous packstones and sandy to conglomeratic beds with high fossil content.

Etymology 
The formation was defined in 2015 by Moreno et al., and given the name Ware, meaning "friend" in Wayuunaiki, the language of the local indigenous Wayuu, meaning "friend". The name has been given to pay tribute to the friendship between Colombia and Venezuela.

Description

Lithologies 
The Ware Formation consists of fine lithic to quartzitic sandstones, mudstones, pebbly conglomerates with sedimentary and metamorphic rock fragments, fossiliferous packstones and sandy to conglomeratic beds with high fossil content.

Stratigraphy and depositional environment 
The Ware Formation overlies the Castilletes Formation and is overlain by Quaternary alluvium. The age has been estimated to be Late Miocene to Early Pleistocene (5.2 to 1.22 Ma), Uquian, Chapadmalalan and Montehermosan in the SALMA classification, with a narrow definition in the Pliocene (3.5 to 2.8 Ma). The marine invertebrate fauna of the Ware Formation shows a greater similarity with modern assemblages offshore of the Guajira Peninsula than with those of the underlying units. The base of the Ware Formation was deposited in a fluvio-deltaic environment, whereas the marine invertebrate assemblage at the top of the unit contains taxa typical of exposed open-ocean shoreface and nearshore settings, but with proximity to coral reef habitats. The Ware Formation correlates with the San Gregorio Formation in the Venezuelan Falcón Basin.

Fossil content

See also 

 Geology of the Eastern Hills
 Cesar-Ranchería Basin
 Honda Group
 Chorrera, Pisco, Tilatá, Tunjuelo Formations
 Urumaco

References

Bibliography

Local geology

Paleontology

Maps 
 
 
 
 

Geologic formations of Colombia
Neogene Colombia
Pleistocene Colombia
Miocene Series of South America
Pliocene Series of South America
Uquian
Chapadmalalan
Montehermosan
Sandstone formations
Mudstone formations
Conglomerate formations
Deltaic deposits
Fluvial deposits
Fossiliferous stratigraphic units of South America
Paleontology in Colombia
Geography of La Guajira Department
Wayuu language